Bernard Essers (11 March 1893 – 13 May 1945) was a Dutch painter. His work was part of the painting event in the art competition at the 1936 Summer Olympics. Essers' work was included in the 1939 exhibition and sale Onze Kunst van Heden (Our Art of Today) at the Rijksmuseum in Amsterdam.

References

External links

1893 births
1945 deaths
20th-century Dutch painters
Dutch male painters
Olympic competitors in art competitions
20th-century Dutch male artists